Heyatabad (also romanized as Heyatābād) is a village in Cheraghabad Rural District, Tukahur District, Minab County, Hormozgan Province, Iran. At the 2006 census, its population was 273, in 54 families.

References 

Populated places in Minab County